Inspirasyon (English: Inspiration) is a song by Filipino rapper Shehyee from his debut eponymous album on 2013. It was released on November 30, 2013.

Music video
The song's music video that features the track's composer and performer in a studio with a band has reached almost six million views on YouTube.

Commercial performance
It was featured on local radio's top ten lists consistently from 2013 to 2014 after Shehyee's breakout fame from FlipTop Battle League.

Critical reception

The track was praised as a 'quality inspirational and motivational song with also a quality music video' by an author in the blog site UrbanPinas.

References

2013 songs
Philippine hip hop songs
Tagalog-language songs